The Marlow-Hunter 47 is an American sailboat that was designed by the Hunter Design Team as a cruiser and first built in 2016.

Production
The design was built by Hunter Marine in the United States, starting in 2016 and remained in production through 2019.

Design
The Marlow-Hunter 47 is a recreational keelboat, built predominantly of  vinylester fiberglass, with a Nida-core sandwich and Kevlar reinforcing, with a hard chine hull. It has a fractional sloop B&R rig, a nearly plumb stem, a reverse transom with a fold-down swimming platform, telescoping ladder and a dinghy garage, an internally mounted spade-type rudder controlled by a wheel and a fixed deep fin keel or optional wing keel. The deep fin keel model displaces  and carries  of ballast, while the wing keel version displaces  and carries  of ballast.

The steering wheel is hydraulically-canting and can be pivoted though 90° as desired by the helmsman. This provides the advantages of a dual-wheel configuration, but occupies less cockpit space. The wheel also folds when not in use.

Factory options include roller furling jib and mast-furling mainsail.

Operational history
Suffice to say you will be quite comfortable on this 47-footer. ... I can see this new model having a lot of appeal for a lot of people looking for a comfortable ride".

In an August 2016 review Cruising World, noted "The Marlow-Hunter 47 marches to a different beat, with design concepts borrowed from the power side of the company. A raised cabin top features windows all around and provides room below for multilevel accommodations and a raised saloon sole that lets you sit up to enjoy the view."

In a March 2017 review in Pacific Yachting Sven Donaldson wrote, "The new Marlow Hunter 47 is similar in size to the current MH-50 centre cockpit and aft cockpit models, but there's no question that it's targeting a more exalted market niche. The basic concept is what I'd call a classic deck salon arrangement that situates the "great cabin" and galley in an elevated central space beneath a tall, traditional-looking coach house. Overhanging "eyebrows" shield the wrap-around windows, and the clean, flat cabin top serves as an excellent lounging area. Because the main cabin sole is raised, it's only three steps down from the cockpit, so moving between the two principle social areas is comparatively easy." He concluded, "The new MH-47 is quite novel both in design and execution—not at all what one might ordinarily expect from a mass production builder. On the other hand, the Hunter legacy is one of innovation, so it's not entirely surprising to see another unusual yacht emerge from this quarter. This particular Marlow Hunter won't be a mass-market boat, nor is it intended to be."

A May 2017 review in Blue Water Sailing noted, "The all new Marlow Hunter 47 offers her owners an aft cockpit, raised-deck saloon configuration that optimizes living space and comfort at sea. With the standard B & R rig and small headsail, the 47 will be easy to sail and should be fast off the wind. The accommodations offer a great master cabin forward with a huge head and lots of storage".

A 2018 write-up in Specialty Yachts wrote of the design, "the new Marlow Hunter 47 is the boat of the future. With her own incredibly unique style, unlike anything currently available, this boat will blow you out of the water!"

See also
List of sailing boat types

Similar sailboats
C&C 50
Hunter HC 50
Marlow-Hunter 50
Marlow-Hunter 50 Center Cockpit

References

External links

Keelboats
2010s sailboat type designs
Sailing yachts
Sailboat type designs by Hunter Design Team
Sailboat types built by Hunter Marine